

Heinz Günther Guderian (23 August 1914 – 25 September 2004) was a German officer in the  and later a major general and Inspector of Panzer Troops in the West German  and NATO. He was the son of World War II General Heinz Guderian.

Born in Goslar in what was then the Prussian Province of Hanover, Heinz Günther Guderian entered the German Army as an officer cadet on 1 April 1933. He saw combat during the invasion of Poland and was wounded twice during the Battle of France in 1940. He graduated from the General Staff College in 1942 and served as a staff officer in various armored units until being assigned as the Operations Officer for the 116th  ("The Greyhounds") in May 1942, a position he held until the end of the War.
He was captured at the conclusion of World War II and held as a prisoner of war until 1947. He retired in 1974.

Awards
 Iron Cross (1939)
 Second Class
 First Class 
 Knight's Cross of the Iron Cross

 Wehrmacht Long Service Award 4th Class
 Wound Badge in Silver
 Panzer Badge in Silver
 Federal German Grand Cross of the Order of Merit (21 December 1972)
 Swedish order of the Sword, commander 1st class (15 May 1972)

Works by Guderian
 From Normandy to the Ruhr: With the 116th Panzer Division in WWII (The Aberjona Press, 2001)

References

External links
 

1914 births
2004 deaths
Bundeswehr generals
Commanders Crosses of the Order of Merit of the Federal Republic of Germany
People from Goslar
People from the Province of Hanover
Recipients of the Knight's Cross of the Iron Cross
Major generals of the German Army
German Army personnel of World War II
Military personnel from Lower Saxony